Zohar is a Hebrew name meaning "Splendor, radiance". It is used either as a given name or a surname.

People 
 Avivi Zohar (born 1972), Israeli footballer
 Itzik Zohar (born 1970), Israeli footballer and television commentator
 Miki Zohar (born 1980), Israeli lawyer and politician
 Miriam Zohar (born 1931), Israeli actress
Uri Zohar (1935-2022), Israeli film director and actor
 Zohar Argov (1955-1987), Israeli singer
Zohar Shikler (born 1997), Israeli Olympic swimmer
Zohar Zimro (born 1977), Israeli marathon runner
Zohar, a minor figure in the Hebrew Bible

Other
 Zohar, one of the two phantom torsos carried by the Artemis 1 mission

See also 
 Bar Zohar, a related name
 The Zohar, considered the most important work of Kabbalah
 The Zohar Tinyanah, considered a "second book" of the Zohar

Hebrew-language surnames
Hebrew-language given names